Erhan Kavak (born 16 December 1987) is a Swiss footballer who currently plays for AS Italiana Bern.

Career 
In January 2006 he was transferred from FC Münsingen of 1. Liga to BSC Young Boys in Bern. On 1 July 2008 he moved to FC Biel-Bienne on loan and turned back on 30 June 2009 to Bern and on 28 July 2009 FC Thun have signed the attacking midfielder on loan from BSC Young Boys until the end of the year. In summer of 2010, he signed Karşıyaka for 2 years.

External links
football.ch profile 
FC Biel-Bienne profile

References

1987 births
Living people
Swiss men's footballers
Swiss people of Turkish descent
BSC Young Boys players
FC Biel-Bienne players
FC Thun players
Swiss Super League players
Karşıyaka S.K. footballers
Kartalspor footballers
Association football forwards
Switzerland youth international footballers
Footballers from Bern
Swiss expatriate footballers
Expatriate footballers in Turkey
Swiss expatriate sportspeople in Turkey
FC Münsingen players